Paratachycampa is a genus of two-pronged bristletails in the family Campodeidae. There are at least two described species in Paratachycampa.

Species
These two species belong to the genus Paratachycampa:
 Paratachycampa hispanica Bareth & Conde, 1981 g
 Paratachycampa peynoensis Bareth & Conde, 1981 g
Data sources: i = ITIS, c = Catalogue of Life, g = GBIF, b = Bugguide.net

References

Further reading

 
 
 

Diplura